Edward Manton (1760-1820) was a delegate to the Hartford Convention in 1814-15.

Manton was born May 26, 1760 in Johnston, Rhode Island. Manton served as a presidential elector in United States Presidential Election of 1800. Manton "rarely mingled in the political discussions of his day. He was a man of sterling worth in every relation in life." He was elected as a delegate to the Hartford Convention in 1814-15. Manton died on September 20, 1820 and is buried in the Colonel Daniel Manton Lot in Johnston, Rhode Island, USA.

References and external links
Manton's Grave picture

Rhode Island politicians
1820 deaths
Year of birth uncertain
1760 births